A gubernatorial election was held on 23 April 1959 to elect the Governor of Saga Prefecture. Sunao Ikeda won the governorship in an election of three newcomers.

Candidates
 – Secretary General of the Board of Audit, age 57
 – the only non-independent candidate, age 47
 – candidate in the 1955 Saga gubernational election, age 45

Results

References

Saga gubernatorial elections
1959 elections in Japan